Transforming acidic coiled-coil-containing protein 1 is a protein that in humans is encoded by the TACC1 gene.

Function 

The function of this gene has not yet been determined; however, it is speculated that it may represent a breast cancer candidate gene.  It is located close to FGFR1 on a region of chromosome 8 that is amplified in some breast cancers.

Interactions 

TACC1 has been shown to interact with:

 Aurora A kinase, 
 Aurora B kinase, 
 BARD1, 
 CKAP5,
 LSM7, 
 SNRPG,  and
 TDRD7.

References

Further reading